F. Gary Simpson is an American politician. He was a Republican member of the Delaware Senate from 1998 to 2018. Simpson earned his BS and MS at the University of Delaware.

Electoral history
In 1998, Simpson won the general election with 6,458 votes (53.1%) against Democratic nominee Gary Downes.
In 2002, Simpson won the general election with 8,875 votes 57.4%) against Democratic nominee John Burton.
In 2004, Simpson won the general election with 14,392 votes (63.3%) against Democratic nominee F. Thomas Savage.
In 2008, Simpson faced Democrat Gary Downes in a rematch of their 1998 contest, and Simpson won with 14,596 votes (55.1%) against Downes.
In 2012, Simpson won the Republican primary with 1,515 votes (68.0%) and was unopposed for the general election, winning 13,198 votes.

References

External links
Official page at the Delaware General Assembly
 

21st-century American politicians
Republican Party Delaware state senators
Living people
People from Milford, Delaware
Place of birth missing (living people)
University of Delaware alumni
Year of birth missing (living people)